Louis H. Pinkham Jr. (January 1888 – February 5, 1919) was an American football player and coach. He played college football at the University of Oregon from 1907 to 1910 as a tackle and served as the head football coach at Oregon in 1912, compiling a record of 3–4. He also served as an assistant coach to Oregon in 1910 and 1911. By 1916, Pinkham was working as a land surveyor and civil engineer for the United States Federal Government. Pinkam was commissioned a first lieutenant and served with the United States Army during World War I. He participated in the Meuse-Argonne Offensive and the Second Battle of the Marne. Pinkham died of bronchopneumonia, in France on February 5, 1919.

Head coaching record

References

1888 births
1919 deaths
American civil engineers
American football tackles
United States Army personnel of World War I
Deaths from bronchopneumonia
Deaths from pneumonia in France
Oregon Ducks football coaches
Oregon Ducks football players
Players of American football from Washington (state)
United States Army officers